This list of the Paleozoic life of Maryland contains the various prehistoric life-forms whose fossilized remains have been reported from within the US state of Maryland and are between 538.8 and 252.17 million years of age.

A

 †Acanthopecten – tentative report
 †Acanthopecten armigerus
 †Acanthopecten carboniferus
 †Acanthotriletes
 †Acanthotriletes pullus
 †Acoblatta – type locality for genus
 †Acoblatta argillacea – type locality for species
 †Actinopteria
 †Actinopteria boydi
 †Actinopteria boydii
 †Actinopteria decussata
 †Aglaoglypta
 †Aglaoglypta maera
 †Ambloblatta – type locality for genus
 †Ambloblatta bassleri – type locality for species
 †Ambocoelia
 †Ambocoelia umbonata
 †Ambonychia
 †Amphiscapha
 †Amphiscapha catilloides
  †Amplexopora
 †Anapiculatisporites
 †Anapiculatisporites crassisetus – type locality for species
 †Anazyga
 †Anazyga recurvirostra – tentative report
 †Ancyrospora
 †Ancyrospora ancyrea
 †Aneurospora
 †Aneurospora semizonalis
 †Anoplotheca
 †Anthraconeilo
 †Anthraconeilo taffiana
 †Aparchites
 †Aparchites punctillosa
 †Archaeoscyphia
 †Archaeotriletes
 †Archaeotriletes aduncus
 †Archaeozonotriletes
 †Archaeozonotriletes notatus
 †Archimylacris
 †Archimylacris delicata – type locality for species
 †Arthroacantha
 †Arthroacantha punctobrachiata – or unidentified comparable form
 †Astartella
 †Astartella concentrica
 †Astartella vera
 †Atlanticocoelia
 †Atrypa
  †Atrypa reticularis – report made of unidentified related form or using admittedly obsolete nomenclature
  †Aviculopecten

B

 †Bactrites
 Bairdia
 †Bassipterus
 †Bassipterus virginicus
 †Batostomella
 †Bellefontia
 †Bellefontia collieana – tentative report
  †Bellerophon
 †Bellerophon clarki
 †Beyrichia
 †Beyrichia moodeyi
 †Beyrichia veronica
 †Biharisporites
 †Biharisporites maguashensis
 †Bolbiprimitia
 †Bollia
 †Bollia immersa
 †Bollia nitida
 †Bollia pulchella
 †Bonnemaia
 †Bonnemaia celsa
 †Bonnemaia perlonga
 †Brachymylacris
 †Brachymylacris martini – type locality for species
 †Brochotriletes
 †Bucania – tentative report
 †Buthotrephis
 †Buthotrephis gracilis
 †Buthrotrephis
 †Byssonychia
 †Byssonychia radiata
 Bythocypris
 †Bythocypris obesa
 †Bythocypris pergracilis

C

 †Calamospora
 †Calamospora atava
 †Calamospora nigrata
  †Calymene
 †Calymene camerata
 †Calymene cresapensis
  †Calymene niagarensis – or unidentified comparable form
 †Calymene niagraensis
 †Camarotoechia
 †Camarotoechia andrewsi
 †Camarotoechia litchfieldensis
 †Camarotoechia tonolowayensis
 †Cariniferella
 †Cariniferella carinata
 †Cavellina
 †Ceratopea
 †Cheliphlebia – tentative report
 †Cheliphlebia argillacea – type locality for species
 †Chonetes
 †Chonetes novascoticus
 †Chonetina
 †Chonetina verneuilianus
 †Chonostrophia
  †Cincinnetina
 †Cincinnetina multisecta
 †Clidophorus
 †Clidophorus nitidus
 †Clitendoceras
 †Coelospira
 †Coelospira nitens
 †Coelospira sulcata
  †Composita
 †Composita ovata – tentative report
 †Conularia
 †Conularia niagarensis
 †Convolutispora
 †Convolutispora subtilis
 †Coreanoceras
  †Cornulites
 †Cornulites concavus
 †Cornulites rosehillensis
 †Corvellites
 †Crurithyris
 †Crurithyris planoconvexa
 †Cryptolithus
 †Ctenodonta
 †Ctenodonta subreniformis
 †Culunana
 †Culunana attenuata
 †Cupularostrum
 †Cupularostrum contracta
 †Cyathophyllum
 †Cymatospira
 †Cymatospira montfortianus
 †Cyphomylacris – type locality for genus
 †Cyphomylacris atrata – type locality for species
 †Cyphotrypa
 †Cypricardella
 †Cypricardella crassa
 †Cypricardella cumberlandiae
 †Cypricardella gregaria
 †Cypricardella nitidula
 †Cypricardella tenuistriata
 †Cypricardinia
 †Cypricardinia elegans
 †Cyrtina
 †Cyrtodontula
 †Cyrtodontula subtruncata

D

 †Dakeoceras
   †Dalmanites
 †Dalmanites limulurus
 †Dekayia
 †Delthyris
 †Delthyris vanuxemi
 †Derbyia
 †Derbyia crassa
 †Diaphanospora
 †Diaphanospora reticulatus
 †Diaphelasma
 †Dibolbina
 †Dibolbina cristata
 †Dictyotriletes
 †Dinoblatta – type locality for genus
 †Dinoblatta cubitalis – type locality for species
 †Dinoblatta fortis – type locality for species
 †Diparelasma
 †Dizygopleura
 †Dizygopleura acuminata
 †Dizygopleura carinata
 †Dizygopleura conjugata
 †Dizygopleura costata
 †Dizygopleura gibba
 †Dizygopleura halli
 †Dizygopleura intermedia
 †Dizygopleura micula
 †Dizygopleura perrugosa
 †Dizygopleura pricei
 †Dizygopleura proutyi
 †Dizygopleura simulans
 †Dizygopleura subdivisa
 †Dizygopleura subovalis
 †Dizygopleura swartzi
 †Dizygopleura symmetrica
  †Dolichopterus
 †Doloresella
 †Donaldina
 †Donaldina stevensana
 †Drepanellina
 †Drepanellina clarki
 †Drepanellina ventralis
 †Dunbarella
 †Dunbarella striata – type locality for species

E

 †Ecculiomphalus
 †Edmondia
 †Edmondia aspenwallensis
 †Edmondia pseudoreflexa – type locality for species
 †Eldredgeops
 †Eldredgeops rana
 †Elita
 †Ellesmeroceras
 †Emphanisporites
 †Emphanisporites annulatus
 †Emphanisporites rotatus
  †Encrinurus
 †Encrinurus ornatus
 †Endocycloceras
 †Endocycloceras legorense
 †Eospirifer
 †Eospirifer crispus
  †Erettopterus – tentative report
 †Escharendoceras
 †Euchondria
 †Euchondria levicula – tentative report
 †Eukloedenella
 †Eukloedenella elongata
 †Eukloedenella punctillosa
 †Eukloedenella sinuata
 †Eukloedenella sulcifrons
 †Eukloedenella umbilicata
 †Euomphalus
 †Euphemites
 †Euphemites vittatus
  †Eurypterus
 †Eurypterus remipes
 †Euthydesma

F

  †Favosites
 †Favosites niagarensis – or unidentified comparable form
 †Finkelnburgia
 †Finkelnburgia virginica – tentative report
 †Fistulipora
 †Flexicalymene
 †Floweria
 †Floweria chemungensis
 †Foveosporites
 †Foveosporites insculptus

G

 †Gasconadia
 †Gasconadia putilla
 †Geminospora
 †Geminospora svalbardiae
 †Geminospora tuberculata
 †Girtyspira
 †Girtyspira minuta
 †Glabrocingulum
 †Glabrocingulum grayvillense
 †Glabrocingulum ornatum
 †Glyptoglossella
 †Glyptoglossella cavellosa
 †Glyptorthis
 †Glyptorthis equiconvexa – type locality for species
  †Goniatites
 †Grammysia
 †Gyrodoma
 †Gyrodoma marylandica

H

 †Halliella
 †Halliella fissurella
 †Halliella subequata
  †Hallopora
 †Healdia
 †Hebertella
 †Hebertella sinuata
 †Hemimylacris – type locality for genus
 †Hemimylacris bassleri – type locality for species
 †Heterotrypa
 †Hindella
 †Hindella congregata
 †Hippocardia
 †Hippocardia cumberlandiae – type locality for species
  †Holopea
 †Homeospira
 †Homeospira evax
 †Hormotoma
 †Hormotoma hopkinsi
 †Hormotoma rowei
  †Hyolithes
 †Hystricosporites
 †Hystricosporites porcatus
 †Hystriculina – tentative report
 †Hystriculina wabashensis
 †Hystricurus

I

 †Inaperaturate
 †Ischyrodonta – tentative report
 †Ischyrodonta truncata
  †Isotelus

J

 †Juresania
 †Juresania symmetrica – tentative report

K

 †Kitikamispira
 †Kitikamispira concinna
 †Kitikamispira multistriata
 †Kloedenella
 †Kloedenella cornuta
 †Kloedenella immersa
 †Kloedenella intermedia
 †Kloedenella nitida
 †Kloedenia
 †Kloedenia normalis
 †Kyammodes
 †Kyammodes swartzi

L

 †Lasiocrinus
 †Lasiocrinus scoparius – or unidentified comparable form
 †Lecanospira
 †Lecanospira compacta – tentative report
 †Leiorhynchus
 †Leperditia
 †Leperditia alta
 †Leperditia elongata
 †Leptaena
 †Leptaena rhomboidalis – report made of unidentified related form or using admittedly obsolete nomenclature
 †Lepterditia
 †Leptodesma
 †Leptodesma marylandica
 †Leptodesma naviforme
 †Leptodesma nitida
 †Leptodesma spinerigum
 †Leptodesma subplana – or unidentified comparable form
 †Leptostrophia
 †Leptostrophia proutyi
 †Lesueurilla
 †Levenea
 †Lichenaria
  †Lingula
 †Lingula carbonaria
 †Lingula gracilis
 †Linoproductus
 †Linoproductus prattenianus
 †Liocalymene
 †Liocalymene clintoni
 †Lobosiphon
 †Longispina
 †Lophotriletes
 †Lophotriletes atratus
 †Loxonema
 †Lyrodesma
 †Lyrodesma poststriatum
   †Lysorophus
 †Lytospira

M

 †Macluritella
 †Macluritella marylandica – type locality for species
 †Mastigobolbina
 †Mastigobolbina arguta
 †Mastigobolbina lata
 †Mastigobolbina typus
 †Mcqueenoceras
 †Meekospira
 †Meekospira percuta – or unidentified related form
 †Megamolgophis
 †Megamolgophis agostini
 †Melanoblattula – type locality for genus
 †Melanoblattula nigrescens – type locality for species
 †Meristina
  †Metacoceras
 †Metacoceras marylandica – type locality for species
 †Modiolopsis
 †Modiolopsis gregarius
 †Modiolopsis leightoni
 †Modiolopsis modiolaris
 †Modiomorpha
 †Monticulipora
 †Mylacris
 †Mylacris lapsa – type locality for species
 †Mysticoceras

N

 †Narkema
 †Narkema alternatum – type locality for species
  †Naticopsis
 †Neochonetes
 †Neochonetes granulifer
 †Neospirifer
 †Neospirifer dunbari – tentative report
 †Nucleospira
 †Nucularca
 †Nucularca pectunculoides
 †Nuculites
 †Nuculopsis
 †Nuculopsis anadontoides
 †Nuculopsis girtyi

O

  †Obolella
 †Obolus – tentative report
 †Ochetopteron – type locality for genus
 †Ochetopteron canaliculatum – type locality for species
 †Octonaria
 †Octonaria muricata
  †Olenellus
 †Olethroblatta
 †Olethroblatta lineolata – type locality for species
 †Ophileta
 †Orbiculoidea
 †Orbiculoidea missouriensis – tentative report
 †Ormoceras
 †Ormoceras neumani
 †Orospira
  †Orthoceras
 †Orthoceras mackenzicum
 †Orthomylacris
 †Orthomylacris berryi – type locality for species
 †Orthomylacris recta – type locality for species
 †Orthonychia
 †Orthonychia prosseri
 †Orthonychia unguiculata
 †Orthopora
 †Orthorhynchula
 †Orthorhynchula linneyi

P

 †Pachyblatta – type locality for genus
 †Pachyblatta convexa – type locality for species
 †Pachyblatta radiata – type locality for species
 †Palaeoneilo
 †Palaeoneilo angusta
 †Palaeoneilo brevis
 †Palaeoneilo clarkei
 †Palaeoneilo constricta
 †Palaeoneilo crassa
 †Palaeoneilo petila
 †Palaeoneilo plana
 †Palaeozygopleura
 †Palaeozygopleura glabra – tentative report
 †Palaeozygopleura hamiltoniae
 †Palaeozygopleura styliola
 †Palaeozygopleura terebra
 †Paleonucula
 †Paleonucula croneisi
 †Paleyoldia – type locality for genus
 †Paleyoldia glabra
 †Paracyclas
 †Paracyclas lirata
 †Paraechmina
 †Paraechmina abnormis
 †Paraechmina crassa
 †Paraechmina depressa
 †Paraechmina postica
 †Paraechmina spinosa
 †Parajuresania
 †Parajuresania nebrascensis – tentative report
 †Parallelodon
 †Parallelodon tenuistriata
 †Patellilabia
 †Patellilabia tentoriolum – tentative report
 †Permophorus
 †Permophorus oblongus
 †Peronopora – tentative report
 †Pharkidonotus
 †Pharkidonotus percarinatus
 †Pholidops
 †Pholidops squamiformis
 †Pholidostrophia
 †Phragmosiphon
 †Phymatopleura
 †Phymatopleura brazonensis
 †Pintopsis
 †Plagioglypta
 †Plagioglypta annulostriata
   †Platyceras
 †Platyceras marylandicum
 †Platyceras niagarense
 †Platysiphon
 †Plectonotus
 †Plectonotus boucoti
 †Plethobolbina
 †Plethobolbina cornigera
 †Plethobolbina typicalis
 †Pleurophorus
 †Pleurophorus occidentalis
 †Pliendoceras
 †Polidevcia – type locality for genus
 †Polidevcia bellistriata
 †Polytoechia – tentative report
 †Praenucula
 †Praenucula lavata
 †Proterocameroceras
 †Prothyris
 †Prothyris singewaldi – type locality for species
 †Protodouvillina
 †Psalikilus
 †Pseudoatrypa
 †Pseudorthoceras
 †Pseudorthoceras knoxense
 †Pseudozygopleura
 †Pseudozygopleura girtyi – or unidentified comparable form
 †Pterinea
 †Pterinea demissa
 †Pterinea flintstonensis
    †Pterygotus
 †Pterygotus marylandicus
 †Punctatisporites
 †Punctatisporites calamites
 †Punctatisporites glaber
 †Punctatisporites laevigatus
 †Punctatisporites solidus

R

 †Rafinesquina
 †Rafinesquina alternata
 †Rafinesquina corrugata
 †Resserella
 †Resserella elegantula
 †Reticularia
 †Reticularia bicostata
 †Retroclitendoceras
 †Retusotriletes
 †Retusotriletes goensis
 †Retusotriletes planus
 †Retusotriletes punctatus
 †Rhabdosporites
 †Rhabdosporites parvulus
 †Rhipidomella
 †Rhombopora – tentative report
 †Rhombopora lepidendroides – or unidentified comparable form
 †Rhynchospirina
 †Rhynchospirina globosa
 †Ribeiria
 †Rioceras
 †Ruedemannia – tentative report
 †Ruedemannia lirata

S

 †Samarisporites
 †Samarisporites grossicorrugatus – type locality for species
 †Samarisporites grossicorugatus
 †Sansabella
 †Schellwienella
 †Schellwienella elegans
 †Schellwienella rugosa
 †Schellwienella tenuis
 †Schizodus
 †Schizodus curtus
 †Schizodus oherni
 †Schizodus wheeleri
 †Schuchertella
 †Serpulopsis
 †Serpulopsis insita
 †Shansiella
 †Shansiella carbonaria – tentative report
 †Shellwienella
 †Shellwienella elegans
  Solemya
 †Solemya radiata
 †Solemya trapezoides
 †Soleniscus
 †Soleniscus primigenius
 † Solenopsis
 †Solenopsis solenoides
 †Sowerbyella
 †Sowerbyella serica
 †Sowerbyella sericea
 †Spaniodera – tentative report
 †Spaniodera simplex – type locality for species
 †Spelaeotriletes
 †Spinozonotriletes
  †Spirifer
 †Spirifer disjunctus
 †Spirifer vanuxemi
 †Stegerhynchus
 †Stegerhynchus neglectum
 †Stenosiphon
 †Stereostylus
 †Stereostylus profundus
 †Stichotrophia
 †Straparollus
 †Straparollus marylandicus
 †Strobeus
 †Strobeus paludinaeformis
   †Strophomena
 †Syntrophinella

T

 †Tainoceras
 †Tainoceras monolifer
 †Tancrediopsis
 †Tancrediopsis cuneata
   †Tentaculites
 †Tentaculites gyracanthus
 †Tentaculites minutus
 †Tentaculites niagarense
 †Tentaculites niagarensis
 †Tetralobula
 †Trigonocera
 †Trimerus
 †Trimerus delphinocephalus
 †Tritoechia
 †Truncalosia
 †Turbonopsis
 †Turbonopsis coronola – type locality for species

U

 †Uncinulus
 †Uncinulus marylandicus
 †Uncinulus obtusiplicatus
 †Uncinulus stricklandi

V

 †Verrucosisporites
 †Verrucosisporites rarituberculatus

W

 †Waagenella
 †Waagenella crassus
  †Waeringopterus
 †Waeringopterus cumberlandicus
 †Welleria
 †Welleria obliqua
 †Whitfieldella
 †Whitfieldella marylandica
 †Worthenia
 †Worthenia castlemanensis – type locality for species

X

 †Xenelasma

Z

 †Zygobeyrichia
 †Zygobeyrichia incipiens
 †Zygobeyrichia tonolowayensis
 †Zygobeyrichia ventricornis
 †Zygobeyrichia ventripunctata
 †Zygosella
 †Zygosella postica
 †Zygospira
 †Zygospira modesta

References
 

Paleozoic
Maryland